Scelotes farquharsoni is a species of lizard which is endemic to South Africa.

References

farquharsoni
Reptiles of South Africa
Reptiles described in 2020